Ângelo Torres (born 14 April 1968), is a Portuguese actor and director of São Toméan descent.  He is best known for the roles in the films Kunta, Hay Road and Magnetick Pathways.

Personal life
He was born on 14 April 1968 in Equatorial Guinea. His parents were São Toméans and Torres has 24 brothers, though only three are from the same father and mother. At the age of six, he left Equatorial Guinea and moved to Cuba, where he studied engineering until the age of 21. After seven years in Cuba, he moved to Portugal to study at a Polytechnic institute in Lisbon. Later, he made his acting debut in the production Por ser preto.

He is married to a Galician–speaking Spanish woman and the couple has one daughter, Mar.

Career
His maiden cinema acting came through the film A Ilha dos Escravos. He was elected the Best Secondary Actor of 2012, for the feature film Estrada de Palha. Later in the same year, he won the same award for same film at 18th Festival Caminhos do Cinema Português.

Filmography

See also
 Cinema of Africa
 Mionga ki Ôbo, film made by Torres
 Shooting Stars Award

References

External links
 

Living people
Portuguese film directors
São Tomé and Príncipe people
Equatoguinean people of São Tomé and Príncipe descent
1968 births